Jana Schmieding is a Native American (Cheyenne River Lakota) comedian, actor, podcaster, and writer. She is best known for her roles hosting the podcast Woman of Size, and as a writer and actor on the sitcom Rutherford Falls, and an actor on Reservation Dogs.

Early life and education 
Schmieding is a Lakota woman who grew up in Canby, Oregon, where she says she was raised "pretty traditionally in the Lakota ways." She studied theater at the University of Oregon.

Career

Post-college
After college, Schmieding moved to New York City to pursue her acting dreams. To earn a living, she spent ten years teaching middle and high school, while performing improv in the evenings with Magnet Theater.

In 2016, Schmieding moved to Los Angeles, where she worked at an education-related nonprofit and shifted gears from acting to writing. Between 2017 and 2019, Schmieding hosted "Woman of Size," a podcast in which she and guests discussed experiences of discrimination related to body size.

Rutherford Falls

After three years of working on her writing, Schmieding was hired as one of 12 writers on Rutherford Falls, a Peacock original sitcom. The show focuses on relationships between characters in a Northeastern town and the Indian reservation it borders. She was hired by the show's co-creator, Sierra Teller Ornelas (Navajo Nation), who had previously been a guest on Schmieding's podcast. On August 10, 2020, it was announced that Schmeiding would co-star in the show opposite Ed Helms in addition to serving as a writer. She has praised the show for featuring a modern Native woman rather than those confined to the Old West. 

Rutherford Falls launched with its entire first season available on demand on April 22, 2021. Early reviews praised Schmieding's performance on screen. Writing for The A.V. Club, Saloni Gajjar called Schmieding a "breakout performer," saying that "comedy vet [Ed] Helms...meets his match in co-star and relative newcomer Schmieding, who balances his rigor with a down-to-earth and equally captivating performance." Jen Chaney of Vulture also named Schmieding the show's "breakout star," calling her "a natural." In July 2021, the series was renewed for a second season, with Schmieding continuing as both a writer and co-star. The season premiered on June 16, 2022.

Other work 
Schmieding appears as Bev, the clinic receptionist and one of the "aunties", in the series  Reservation Dogs.

Filmography

References

External links 
 
 

Native American actresses
Native American screenwriters
Cheyenne River Sioux people
American women comedians
Living people
Year of birth missing (living people)
University of Oregon alumni
American television actresses
American television writers
American women television writers
Native American women writers
21st-century American actresses
21st-century American screenwriters
21st-century American women writers
21st-century American comedians
American podcasters
American women podcasters
Actresses from Oregon
Screenwriters from Oregon
Comedians from Oregon